is a passenger railway station on the Saitama Rapid Railway Line in the city of Kawaguchi, Saitama, Japan, operated by the third sector railway operator Saitama Railway Corporation.

Lines

Station layout
The station has an underground island platform serving two tracks. The platforms are equipped with waist-height platform edge doors.

Platforms

Facilities and accessibility
The station concourse and platforms have elevator access. Universal access toilets are available on the concourse level.

History
Tozuka-angyō Station opened on 28 March 2001 with the opening of the Saitama Rapid Railway Line.

Passenger statistics
In fiscal 2019, the station was used by an average of 8,276 passengers daily.

Surrounding area
 Saifuku Temple
 Saitama Prefectural Kawaguchi-Higashi High School

See also
 List of railway stations in Japan

References

External links

 Tozuka-angyō Station information (Saitama Railway) 
 Tozuka-angyō Station (Saitama Prefectural Government) 

Railway stations in Saitama Prefecture
Railway stations in Kawaguchi, Saitama
Railway stations in Japan opened in 2001